GGZ may refer to:

 GGZ Nederland,  Dutch Association of Mental Health and Addiction Care
Global Georgian Airways (ICAO: GGZ), defunct airline

See also
2GGZ, callsign of community radio station, Mount Helen FM 101.7/107.3